Karl Zurflüh (January 26, 1913 – October 1962) was a Swiss boxer who competed in the 1936 Summer Olympics.

In 1936 he was eliminated in the first round of the featherweight class after losing his fight to Remi Lescrauwaet.

External links
Karl Zurflüh's profile at Sports Reference.com
Karl Zurflüh's obituary 

1913 births
1962 deaths
Featherweight boxers
Olympic boxers of Switzerland
Boxers at the 1936 Summer Olympics
Swiss male boxers